NHS Fife is an NHS board which provides healthcare services in Fife, Scotland. It is one of the fourteen regions of NHS Scotland.

Hospitals 
The board runs two main hospitals: 
 Victoria Hospital in Kirkcaldy
 Queen Margaret Hospital in Dunfermline

It also runs a number of community and day hospitals, including: 
 Adamson Hospital in Cupar
 Cameron Hospital in Windygates
 Glenrothes Hospital
 Lynebank Hospital in Dunfermline
 Randolph Wemyss Memorial Hospital in Buckhaven 
 St Andrews Community Hospital
 Stratheden Hospital in Cupar 
 Whyteman's Brae Hospital in Kirkcaldy

Finances 
The board faces an overspend of up to £3.5 million for 2014/5. Financial pressures included the cost of medical locums and bank nurses to fill long-term vacancies in acute services and the impact of new drugs to treat Hepatitis C and Anti-TNF drugs for rheumatology.

In 2019, it was reported that the NHS Fife estate needed £89 million of maintenance to bring the buildings up to acceptable standards, and that this cost had risen by £11.5 million in the last year, primarily due to further deterioration of the tower block at Victoria Hospital.

References

External links 

 

 
Health in Fife
2004 establishments in Scotland
Organisations based in Fife